Pamilya Roces is a 2018 Philippine comedy drama series starring Carla Abellana, Gabbi Garcia and Jasmine Curtis-Smith. The series premiered on GMA Network's GMA Telebabad evening block and worldwide via GMA Pinoy TV from October 8 to December 14, 2018, replacing Inday Will Always Love You.

NUTAM (Nationwide Urban Television Audience Measurement) People in Television Homes ratings are provided by AGB Nielsen Philippines.

Series overview

Episodes

October 2018

November 2018

December 2018

References

Lists of Philippine drama television series episodes